The 2014 Korean Basketball League rookie draft (Korean: 2014 KBL 국내신인선수 드래프트) was held on September 17, 2014, at the Jamsil Students' Gymnasium in Seoul, South Korea. Out of the 39 participants, 21 players were drafted. Goyang Orions won the lottery for first overall pick and also obtained the seventh overall pick via a trade with Busan KT Sonicboom.

Draft selections
This table only shows the first twenty picks.

Players
Lee Seoung-hyun is the first Korea University player since Lee Kyu-sup to be picked first overall. Lee Kyu-sup, now a coach at Seoul Samsung Thunders, had been the first overall pick of the 2000 draft.

The draft received considerable attention as Yonsei University shooting guard Heo Ung, son of then-Jeonju KCC Egis head coach Hur Jae, was among the draft participants. He was one of the few juniors as "early entry" was still considered uncommon at that time. Hur Jae was expected to pick his son but chose Korea University senior Kim Ji-hoo instead and Heo Ung was picked by Hur's former team Wonju Dongbu Promy.

Notes

See also
Korean Basketball League draft

References

External links
 Draft: 2014 KBL Domestic Player draft results / 드래프트: 2014 KBL 국내신인선수 드래프트 결과 — Korean Basketball League official website 

Korean Basketball League draft
Korean Basketball League draft
2010s in Seoul
Korean Basketball League draft
Sport in Seoul
Events in Seoul